Henrik Sørgård Solberg (born April 15, 1987 in Trondheim) is a Norwegian ice hockey defenceman currently playing for the Stavanger Oilers of the Norwegian GET-ligaen.

Playing career
Solberg made his professional debut with Lillehammer IK during the 2005–06 season, while in his last year at NTG High School (Norges Toppidrettsgymnas) in Lillehammer.

After graduating from NTG, he went back home to Trondheim to play for Trondheim Ishockeyklubb, where he played for two seasons. 
On March 3, 2008, after years of financial struggle, Trondheim Ishockeyklubb was discontinued.

On April 22, 2008, Solberg signed a two-year deal with the Stavanger Oilers.

International play
He has participated at the 2010 IIHF World Championship, the 2012 IIHF World Championship and the 2013 IIHF World Championship as a member of the Norway men's national ice hockey team.

On January 7, 2014, he was named to Team Norway's official 2014 Winter Olympics roster.

Career statistics

Regular season and playoffs

International

References

External links

1987 births
Living people
Norwegian ice hockey defencemen
Olympic ice hockey players of Norway
Ice hockey players at the 2014 Winter Olympics
Lillehammer IK players
Stavanger Oilers players
Trondheim Black Panthers players
Sportspeople from Trondheim